Vietsovpetro, headquartered in Vung Tau, Vietnam, is a joint Russian-Vietnamese enterprise for oil and gas exploration. 
According to the VNR500 (Top 500) ranking, Vietsovpetro is Vietnam's 8th largest company.

It was established in 1981 under an inter-governmental agreement between the JSC Zarubezhneft of the Soviet Union and Vietnam's state-owned Petrovietnam, with each side holding half of stake.

On 10 December 2010, VietsovPetro agreed to extend its cooperation with JSC Zarubezhneft for 20 years until 2030. As per the new arrangement, PetroVietnam will hold a 51% stake in the joint venture with the Russian company holding 49%.

See also
 List of oil exploration and production companies in Asia

References

External links
 

Oil and gas companies of Vietnam
Energy companies established in 1981
Non-renewable resource companies established in 1981
Soviet Union–Vietnam relations
Vietnamese companies established in 1981
Joint ventures